Josaphat Joseph Kotsylovsky was a Ukrainian Greek Catholic bishop and martyr.

Kotsylovsky was born 3 March 1876 in the village of Pakoszowka (then Austria-Hungary, now Poland), of the Lemko Region, Sianok district, Kotsylovsky was of Lemko origin, and Ukrainian national orientation.

After graduating from the elementary folk school in Lesko he studied at the Sanok and Sambir gymnasia. From 1896 he studied at the law department of Lviv University. Soon he interrupted the studio and graduated from the school of artillery in Vienna, and of 1900 he was sent to serve in the Lviv garrison. After leaving the military service, and with the assistance of the Przemysl Bishop Kostyantyn Chekhovych, he began the philosophical and theological studies in Rome. He studied theology in Rome and graduated in 1907, later that year on 9 October he was ordained to the priesthood.  Soon after, he was made vice-rector and professor of theology at the Greek-Catholic seminary in Stanislaviv.

On 2 October 1911 he entered the Order of Saint Basil the Great. On 23 September 1917 Kotsylovsky was ordained bishop in Przemyśl (Poland) by Andrey Sheptytsky.  As bishop, he worked to improve the church's educational system and supported monastic orders. He also took steps to combat the rising Russophile movement by appointing Ukrainian priests and funding Ukrainian language journals.

On 10 July 1941 he welcomed the Wehrmacht forces entering Przemyśl. On 4 July 1943 Kotsylovsky led a Mass in the name of the volunteers entering the 14th SS Division.

At the end of World War II, Communist Poland assisted the Soviet Union with the liquidation of the Ukrainian Greek Catholic Church.  In September 1945 the Polish security service arrested Kotsylovsky, then released him and arrested him again in 1946.  They then handed him over to the Soviet security service. He died on 17 November 1947 in a prison camp near Kyiv.

He was beatified by Pope John Paul II on 27 June 2001.

The relics of Josaphat Kotsylovsky are kept in the church of the Annunciation of the Blessed Virgin Mary in Stryi.

Testimony of Father Josaphat Kavatsiv 
Josaphat Kavatsiv states a second hand account of Bishop Josaphat Kotsylovskyi martyrdom as following: 

"I came to the Protection Monastery and the hegumena [prioress] told me the story. When Bishop Kotsylovskyi was arrested, their Orthodox bishop of Kyiv was arrested at the same time. When they brought a package to Chapaievka, the Orthodox bishop said: 'Uniate Bishop Josaphat Kotsylovskyi is confined in the same camp with me.'  And he asked these nuns, if they could, to bring a package to Bishop Josaphat as well. So they brought packages- one for each of the bishops... Once when she brought a package,the bishop said that Kotsylovskyi had died. And he asked her, because the dead were all thrown into one hole,if they could borrow some money or get some money somewhere. He asked her 'to bury him in a separate grave, because this was a holy man.'"

Notes

External links  
 Josaphat Kotsylovsky
 Kotsylovsky, Yosafat, Internet Encyclopedia of Ukraine

1876 births
1947 deaths
Bishops of the Ukrainian Greek Catholic Church
Ukrainian beatified people
Lemkos
Order of Saint Basil the Great
20th-century Eastern Catholic martyrs
Beatifications by Pope John Paul II
People from the Kingdom of Galicia and Lodomeria
Pontifical Urban University alumni
People who died in the Gulag
Ukrainian people who died in Soviet detention
Seminary academics
Clergy in World War II
Polish people of Rusyn descent
People of the Second Polish Republic
People deported from Poland
Bishops in Austria–Hungary
Bishops of Przemyśl